The Mann Center for the Performing Arts (formerly known as the Robin Hood Dell West and Mann Music Center) is a nonprofit performing arts center located in the Centennial District of Philadelphia's West Fairmount Park, built in 1976 as the summer home for the Philadelphia Orchestra. It is the successor in this role to the Robin Hood Dell outdoor amphitheater, where the Philadelphia Orchestra had given summer performances since 1935. It has since hosted artists and touring companies such as the American Ballet Theatre with Mikhail Baryshnikov, Marian Anderson, Leonard Bernstein, Buena Vista Social Club, Ray Charles, Judy Garland, the Metropolitan Opera, Mormon Tabernacle Choir, Paul Robeson, Itzhak Perlman, Lang Lang, Midori, and Yo-Yo Ma.

Major Philadelphia premieres have included the Israel Philharmonic Orchestra, Bolshoi Ballet and Orchestra's production of Spartacus, and Britain's Royal Ballet’s productions of Romeo and Juliet and Swan Lake.

Among the scores of award-winning popular artists presented by the Mann in recent years are Phish, Jack Johnson, Ed Sheeran, Tony Bennett, Mary J. Blige, Roger Daltrey, Bob Dylan, Furthur, Arcade Fire, Aretha Franklin, Whitney Houston, Herbie Hancock, Norah Jones, Diana Krall, Wynton Marsalis, Willie Nelson, Smokey Robinson, Jill Scott, James Taylor, Damien Rice, Blondie with Garbage, Sugarland and Stevie Ray Vaughan.

In 2010, 2011, and 2014, the Mann was nominated by Pollstar, a concert industry trade publication, as "Best Major Outdoor Concert Venue" in North America.

The venue has a total seating capacity of approximately 14,000, with 4,743 seats under the roof and over 8,600 outside.

History 
The present building first opened in 1976 as Robin Hood Dell West and subsequently was designated in 1979 the Mann Music Center in honor of Fredric R. Mann. In 2000, the facility was renamed to The Mann Center for the Performing Arts to reflect the center's plans to broaden its programming and service to the overall community.

Education and community engagement 
The Mann Center for the Performing Arts' Education & Community Engagement program is the region's largest free education program, serving over 50,000 young people annually. The Mann's annual Young People's Concert Series features five free main stage performances making performing arts programs accessible to children in the Philadelphia region. The Connecting Arts-N-Schools series brings guest artists directly into 22 partner schools, and the Judith Gitlin ArtsTeach @ The Mann programs include 6 individual series: Meet the Artist, Tiny Tots Fascination Series, Greenfield Performance Treasures, Connecting Arts @ The center, Artist in Residency and Master Class.

See also
 List of contemporary amphitheatres

References

External links
Mann Center's Official Website MannCenter.org
The Mann Center for the Performing Arts at Facebook
MSS 154, Fredric R. Mann Papers in the Irving S. Gilmore Music Library of Yale University.

Music venues in Philadelphia
West Philadelphia
West Fairmount Park